Negative imaginary (NI)  systems theory was introduced by Lanzon and Petersen in. A generalization of the theory was presented in 
In the single-input single-output (SISO) case, such systems are defined by considering the properties of the imaginary part of the frequency response  G(jω) and require the system to have no poles in the right half plane and  > 0 for all ω in (0, ∞). This means that a system is Negative imaginary if it is both stable and a nyquist plot will have a phase lag between [-π  0] for all ω >  0.

Negative Imaginary Definition 

A square transfer function matrix  is NI if the following conditions are satisfied:
These conditions can be summarized as:
 The system  is stable.
 For all positive frequencies, the nyquist diagram of the system response is between [-π  0].

Negative Imaginary Lemma 

Let  be a minimal realization of the transfer function matrix  . Then,  is NI if and only if  and there exists a matrix

  such that the following LMI is satisfied:

This result comes from positive real theory after converting the negative imaginary system to a positive real system for analysis.

References

Frequency-domain analysis